Coenotes eremophilae is a species of moth of the  family Sphingidae first described by Thomas Pennington Lucas in 1891. It is known from Queensland, Western Australia and the Northern Territory.

The wingspan is about 50 mm. Adults have fawn wings, and a pattern of diagonal and transverse dark marks on the abdomen.

The larvae have been recorded feeding on Eremophila bowmanii, Eremophila freelingii, Eremophila latrobei, Eremophila longifolia, Eremophila sturtii, Eremophila mitchellii, Myoporum deserti, Myoporum montanum, Carissa lanceolata, Gyrocarpus americanus, Prostanthera striatiflora, Hibiscus panduriformis, Acacia farnesitana, Sesamum indicum, Santalum acuminatum, Duboisia myoporoides and Clerodendrum floribundum. They are black with a white stripe along each side, a yellow dorsal stripe, many little pale dots and a row of orange spiracles along each side. On the tail, they have an entirely black curved horn.

References

Sphingulini
Moths described in 1891